Andrei Chesnokov was the defending champion, but lost in the second round to Fabrice Santoro.

Juan Aguilera won the title by defeating Guy Forget 2–6, 6–3, 6–4 in the final.

Seeds

Draw

Finals

Top half

Bottom half

References

External links
 Official results archive (ATP)
 Official results archive (ITF)

Open de Nice Côte d'Azur
1990 ATP Tour